Zanghoma is a small village in Greater Tzaneen Local Municipality in the Limpopo province of South Africa.

Notable people includes Academician Dr. Professor Abraham Manase, who is a senior Data Management Analyst and currently teaches at Westcliff University in California, USA.
Principal Lucas Mokoena, Political activist Shaun Mhlanga, Vongani Khumalo and Endlani Mlambo.

Zanghoma village is famous for being a Christian village.

References

Populated places in the Greater Tzaneen Local Municipality
1990 establishments in South Africa